Vizovice is a town in Zlín District in the Zlín Region of the Czech Republic. It has about 4,800 inhabitants. The historic town centre is well preserved and is protected by law as an urban monument zone.

Administrative parts
The village of Chrastěšov is an administrative part of Vizovice.

Geography
It is located on the small river of Lutoninka. It lies in the Vizovice Highlands, which is named after the town.

History

The first written mention of Vizovice is from 1261, when it was owned by the newly established Smilheim monastery. During the Hussite Wars, the monastery and the village were badly damaged and looted. In 1483, the estate was acquired by the lords of Kunštát, and in 1485 the Cistercian monastery was definitely abolished.

In 1567, the estate was bought by Zdeněk Kavka of Říčany, who had built a Renaissance residence called Nový Smilheim in the fortified area of the abolished monastery. Vizovice received town privileges in 1570. In the second half of the 17th century, the estate became a property of the Gollen family. Shortly after the town and the castle were burned down by Turkish invaders. In 1750–1770, during the rule of Count Hermann Hannibal of Blümegen, a new Baroque castle with French and English garden was built.

Demographics

Economy
Vizovice has long history of the alcohol production. A distillery in Vizovice was first documented in 1585. The local climate is suitable for fruit trees, especially plums, and in the mid-18th century, slivovitz started being produced here. The Rudolf Jelínek distillery was founded here in 1882.

Culture
The annual Masters of Rock heavy metal festival takes place in Vizovice.

Sights

The Vizovice Castle is the main landmark. In 1945, the castle was nationalized. It is open to the public

Notable people
Alois Hába (1893–1973), composer
Jan Graubner (born 1948), Roman Catholic archbishop of Olomouc; worked here as a parson in 1982–1990
Bolek Polívka (born 1949), actor

References

External links

Vizovice Castle

Cities and towns in the Czech Republic
Populated places in Zlín District
Moravian Wallachia